Anantharam may refer to:

Places in India
 Anantharam, Bhongir mandal, Nalgonda district, Telangana
 Anantharam, Shamirpet mandal, Ranga Reddy district, Telangana
 Anantharam, Medak district, Telangana

Other uses
 Anantaram, a 1987 Indian Malayalam film

See also
 Ananthavaram (disambiguation)